Arizky Wahyu Satria (born 7 August 1998) is an Indonesian professional footballer who plays as a right-back for Liga 1 club Persebaya Surabaya.

Club career

Persebaya Surabaya
He was signed for Persebaya Surabaya to play in Liga 1 in the 2021 season. Arizky made his league debut on 4 September 2021 in a match against Borneo at the Wibawa Mukti Stadium, Cikarang.

Career statistics

Club

Notes

References

External links
 Arizky Wahyu Satria at Soccerway
 Arizky Wahyu Satria at Liga Indonesia

1998 births
Living people
Sportspeople from Surabaya
Sportspeople from East Java
Indonesian footballers
Liga 1 (Indonesia) players
Persebaya Surabaya players
Indonesia youth international footballers
Association football defenders